Lukuliro River is a tributary of the Rufiji River that starts  in Liwale District of  Lindi Region, Tanzania. It begins in Mkutano, Liwale ward and Joins the Rufiji in Pwani Region's  Utete ward. The river begins in the Selous Game Reserve.

References

Rivers of Lindi Region
Rivers of Tanzania